Hallucination Strip (originally titled Roma drogata: la polizia non può intervenire) is an Italian 1975 poliziottesco film directed by Lucio Marcaccini as his first and only film.

Singer Sammy Barbot appeared in the film and performed the film's opening song "We've Got A Lord". The song appeared on the film's original soundtrack.

Plot
Massimo Monaldi, a student involved in political protests, steals a valuable tobacco box and becomes entangled in a deadly web between the police and the mafia.

Cast
 Bud Cort as Massimo Monaldi
 Marcel Bozzuffi as Commissioner De Stefani
 Eva Czemerys as Rudy's mother
 Guido Alberti as Chief of Police
 Settimio Segnatelli as Rudy
 Annarita Grapputo as Cinzia
 Leopoldo Trieste as Killer
 Maurizio Arena as Buscemi aka "The Sicilian"
 Ennio Balbo as Antique dealer
 Umberto Raho as Giovanni
 Sammy Barbot as Singer
 Patrizia Gori as Alberta Ferri

References

External links

1975 films
Poliziotteschi films
Films about drugs
1975 directorial debut films
1970s Italian films